Chris Prat is a former indoor lacrosse player in the National Lacrosse League. He last played for the Colorado Mammoth in 2005. Pratt is noted for contributing to his former team's, the Victoria Shamrocks, winning of two Mann cups in 1997 and 1999. He is recognized as an accomplished athlete, as he was inducted into the Canadian Lacrosse Hall of Fame in 2011.

Statistics

NLL

References

Buffalo Bandits players
Calgary Roughnecks players
Colorado Mammoth players
Living people
Year of birth missing (living people)